Swiss Brazilians are Brazilian citizens of full or partial Swiss ancestry, who remain culturally connected to Switzerland, or Swiss-born people permanently residing in Brazil.

Notable Swiss Brazilians
Clóvis Bornay
José Carlos Bauer
A. C. Frieden
Émil Goeldi
Oswaldo Goeldi
Cláudio Heinrich
Heloísa Périssé
Ricardo Boechat
Adriana Lima
Adolfo Lutz
Berta Lutz
Jorge Paulo Lemann
 Eric Walther Maleson
Gérard Moss
Sabrina Sato
Leticia Spiller
Xuxa Meneghel

See also
 Immigration to Brazil
 White Brazilians
 Swiss people
 Swiss Americans

References

 
European Brazilian